Salem Township is one of twelve townships in Carroll County, Illinois, USA.  As of the 2020 census, its population was 350 and it contained 155 housing units.

Geography

Cities, towns, villages
 Mount Carroll (east quarter)

Unincorporated towns
 Ashdale Junction
 Daggett (historical)
(This list is based on USGS data and may include former settlements.)

Cemeteries
The township contains these three cemeteries: Adams-Daggert, Oakville and Trinity Evangelical Lutheran.

Major highways
  US Route 52
  Illinois Route 64
  Illinois Route 78
  Illinois Route 88

Airports and landing strips
 Tautz Brothers Airport
 Williard Nycum RLA Airport

Demographics
As of the 2020 census there were 350 people, 139 households, and 65 families residing in the township. The racial makeup of the township was 95.71% White, 0.00% African American, 0.00% Native American, 0.00% Asian, 0.00% Pacific Islander, 0.29% from other races, and 4.00% from two or more races. Hispanic or Latino of any race were 3.14% of the population.

There were 139 households, out of which 14.40% had children under the age of 18 living with them, 41.73% were married couples living together, 1.44% had a female householder with no spouse present, and 53.24% were non-families. 53.20% of all households were made up of individuals, and 41.70% had someone living alone who was 65 years of age or older. The average household size was 2.19 and the average family size was 3.54.

The township's age distribution consisted of 30.5% under the age of 18, 4.4% from 18 to 24, 15.5% from 25 to 44, 10.7% from 45 to 64, and 38.7% who were 65 years of age or older. The median age was 43.8 years. For every 100 females, there were 99.4 males. For every 100 females age 18 and over, there were 57.6 males.

The median income for a household in the township was $46,806, and the median income for a family was $57,750. Males had a median income of $48,500 versus $37,917 for females. The per capita income for the township was $21,789. About 32.3% of families and 44.7% of the population were below the poverty line, including 80.2% of those under age 18 and 29.5% of those age 65 or over.

School districts
 Chadwick-Milledgeville Community Unit School District 399
 Eastland Community Unit School District 308
 West Carroll Community Unit School District 314

Political districts
 Illinois' 17th congressional district
 State House District 71
 State Senate District 36

References
 
 United States Census Bureau 2007 TIGER/Line Shapefiles
 United States National Atlas

External links
 City-Data.com
 Illinois State Archives
 Carroll County official site

Townships in Carroll County, Illinois
Townships in Illinois